Samuel Mark Sloma (born 29 October 1982) is an English former footballer, who played defender/midfielder.  His teams included  Woking,  Wimbledon, and Dagenham & Redbridge. He played for the Great Britain football team at the 2009 Maccabiah Games in Israel, winning a silver medal.

Early life
He was born in Enfield, England, and is Jewish. He left school at 16 years of age to pursue a professional football career.

Football career
Sloma started out as a trainee with Wimbledon, where he captained their youth side, before being loaned out to Hampton & Richmond Borough. In 2002 he then signed for Aylesbury United, making a total of 18 appearances, before moving on to Wingate & Finchley, with whom he played 167 times up until 2006.

Sloma also played in the United States in 2004 for Milwaukee Wave United in the A-League.

He played for the Great Britain football team at the 2005 Maccabiah Games in Israel, and at the 2009 Maccabiah Games, winning a silver medal.

In February 2006, Sloma joined Isthmian Premier club Wealdstone, before joining Thurrock in the Conference South in April 2006 on dual registration with the "Stones".

Sloma signed for Dagenham & Redbridge in June 2006. He played two seasons for Dagenham & Redbridge, helping them to achieve Football League status for the first time in their history, scoring their first-ever Football League goal. However, he was released at the end of the 2007–08 season alongside Dave Rainford.

In June 2008, Grays Athletic announced Sloma had signed for the Conference National outfit. He scored on his début for the club in a 2–1 home victory over Northwich Victoria in the Conference National, with a 35-yard long-range shot. On 18 November 2008, Sloma scored a goal to put Grays Athletic 1–0 in the lead against Carlisle United in an FA Cup first round clash, only for it to be cancelled due to floodlight failure. The match was replayed on 29 November and Grays lost 2–0.

On 19 January 2009, Sloma was placed on the transfer list by Grays following discussions with the club in which Sloma stated he would not be staying at the club for the 2009–10 season. His contract at Grays was terminated by mutual consent nine days later.

In February 2009, Sloma joined Chelmsford City in the Conference South, teaming up with former Dagenham & Redbridge teammates, Dave Rainford and Chris Moore. On 6 May 2009, Sloma was released from his contract with Chelmsford City.

Sloma joined newly relegated Woking in the Conference South on a one-year contract in June 2009, but was released a year later following an unsuccessful time.

In 2010 he re-signed with former club Wingate & Finchley.

For the 2011–12 season he signed for London Lions.

Honours
Conference National: 2006–07

After football
In 2017, he became a Chartered Financial Planner and started a new financial planning firm, Engage Financial Services.

References

External links

1982 births
Living people
Association football defenders
Association football midfielders
Aylesbury United F.C. players
Chelmsford City F.C. players
Competitors at the 2005 Maccabiah Games
Competitors at the 2009 Maccabiah Games
Dagenham & Redbridge F.C. players
English expatriate footballers
English expatriate sportspeople in the United States
English Football League players
English footballers
English Jews
Expatriate soccer players in the United States
Financial planners
People from Enfield, London
Jewish footballers
Hampton & Richmond Borough F.C. players
Grays Athletic F.C. players
London Lions F.C. players
Isthmian League players
Maccabiah Games medalists in football
Maccabiah Games silver medalists for Great Britain
Milwaukee Wave United players
National League (English football) players
Thurrock F.C. players
Wealdstone F.C. players
Wimbledon F.C. players
Wingate & Finchley F.C. players
Woking F.C. players